The following is a listing of placenames from the Mapudungun language, generally from Chile and southwestern Argentina.

Note: this list includes only currently used placenames that have a Mapudungun etymology for at least part of their name

A

B

C

D

F

G

H

L

M

N

P

Q

R

T

V

Y

See also 
 Araucanization
 Mapuche
 Huilliche
 Picunche
 List of Muisca toponyms

References

Sources
Guiaverde - diccionarios (Spanish)
Mapudungun.cl
 Francisco Solano Asta-Buruaga y Cienfuegos,  Diccionario geográfico de la República de Chile (Geographic dictionary of the Republic of Chile), SEGUNDA EDICIÓN CORREGIDA Y AUMENTADA, NUEVA YORK, D. APPLETON Y COMPAÑÍA, 1899.
  DICCIONARIO MAPUCHE
 Diccionarios Ser Indigena, Lenguas Originarias de Chile
  Español - Mapudungun
  Mapudungun - Español

Lists of place names
.List
Argentina geography-related lists
Chile geography-related lists
Names of places in the Americas